Pauline Gilmour Hatch (1871–1955) was an American composer and hymnwriter.

Life 
Pauline Gilmour Hatch, only daughter of Henry Lake Gilmour, was born at either Caps May, or Wenonah, New Jersey, on April 3, 1871. She manifested a great love for music at an early age, which was encouraged and cultivated in a musical atmosphere, William J. Kirkpatrick being her first instrumental teacher. Later she received a diploma from the South Jersey Institute, Bridgeton, New Jersey, and also took a course at Richard Zeckwer's Conservatory of Music in Philadelphia.

She married H. Morgan Hatch, of Delair, New Jersey, on October 30, 1903. Hatch was a member of a family of early Camden settlers. He worked as a Pennsauken tax collector, director of Merchantville National Bank and Trust Co. and proprietor of the former N. J. Auto and Supply Co. He died in 1952. 

Pauline lived for many years at Pennsauken. She died at her home, 6900 River Rd., Pennsauken, on Wednesday, November 9, 1955, aged eighty-four, and was buried in Arlington Cemetery, Pennsauken.

Music 
According to Anthony Johnson Showalter, among her best and most popular compositions are "Volunteers, to the Front", "Our Dearly Loved Banner", "Jesus, Refuge of My Soul" and "Peace Hymn of Nations", "all of which show talent of a high order, coupled with thorough scholarship". Her compositions were published in numerous hymnals.

References

Sources 

 Showalter, A. J. (1904). The Best Gospel Songs and Their Composers. Dalton, GA: The A. J. Showalter Co.; Dallas, TX: The Showalter-Patton Co. p. 276.
 "Obituaries: Mrs. Pauline G. Hatch". Courier-Post. Camden, New Jersey. Thursday, November 10, 1955. p. 4.
 "Pauline Gilmour Hatch". Hymnary.org. Accessed July 12, 2022.
 "Pauline Gilmour Hatch". Hymntime.com. Accessed July 12, 2022.

1871 births
1955 deaths
American hymnwriters